John Wash Pam (22 October 1940 – 1 May 2014) was a Nigerian politician who was Deputy President of the Nigerian Senate from 1979 to 1983. He was elected into the senate on the platform of Dr Nnamdi Azikiwe's Nigerian Peoples Party [NPP]. He was elected Deputy Senate President on the stenght of the accord between his party and the ruling National Party of Nigeria [NPN]. The accord was called "The NPN/NPP Accord". He died in 2014 from prostate cancer Sen JOHN WASH PAM hails from the rural area of rahwol fwi, ron Foron of BARKIN LADI local government of plateau state.

References

1940 births
2014 deaths
Nigerian politicians
Deaths from prostate cancer